The Aman Foundation is a not for profit trust, based in Karachi, Pakistan, focused on solutions in health and education. It was founded in 2008, with a contribution of USD 100 million by  Arif and Fayeeza Naqvi, with the aim of giving fellow Pakistanis healthcare support and skills to reshape their lives and redirect their destinies. A local, not-for-profit trust, the foundation aspires to improve healthcare and education/skills through its direct interventions and supporting a number of high-impact organizations through its grant-giving initiative.

Provision of Grants
Aman Foundation engages in venture philanthropy by providing strategic grants to high-social-impact organizations – such as US$12 million to the Institute of Business Administration to fund the Aman Tower, 12 story building with state of the art classrooms, auditoriums and a library, and the Aman Centre for Entrepreneurial Development, which houses an incubation center and supports the next generation of entrepreneurs. Its partnership with United World Colleges (UWC), which has 15 schools and colleges in multiple countries across the world, has enabled 60 low-income Pakistani students to pursue a two-year International Baccalaureate diploma.

Aman Health Care Services (ACHS)
Aman Health Care Services provides holistic healthcare services ranging from community health interventions to large-scale emergency medical services via self-run programs and strategic partnerships. A combination of these services allows them to ensure holistic service delivery via an eco-system approach leading to quality and affordable health care services with a focus on the underserved segments of the communities they serve.

Aman Ghar
Starting the vision of serving the underserved, Aman Ghar was a project launched in 2008 by the Aman Foundation to provide nutritious meals to primary school students in the Khuda Ki Basti, an underprivileged area of Karachi. Aman Ghar has served over 4 million meals to-date. 
In 2017, Aman Health entered into a partnership with Saylani Welfare International Trust to eradicate hunger.

Aman Ambulance
Aman Health’s flagship initiative, Aman Ambulance, has changed the landscape of emergency care in Pakistan and is the first state-of-the-art life-saving ambulatory vehicle network providing round-the-clock emergency care in the province of Sindh.

With a fleet of 60 ambulances, the service includes trained Emergency Medical Technicians (EMTs), doctors and life-saving drugs and equipment, providing 24/7 emergency medical interventions with a current average response time of 10.3 minutes.

The Aman Ambulance also holds the recognition of being awarded the ‘Best In Asia’ EMS Service Award, in 2014, by The Asian Emergency Council.

Aman Ambulance is run on international protocols, equipped with the latest medical equipment and life-saving drugs and is staffed with trained medical professionals. The service provides a tiered emergency response system with Basic Life Support Ambulances and Advanced Life Support Ambulances equipped with AED machines and cardiac monitors. In addition, Advanced Cardiac Life Support Ambulances are equipped with ECG machines, which is a unique service available in Karachi.

In December 2018, Aman Foundation signed agreements with the Government of Sindh and Patients Aid Society in order to expand emergency medical services in the country by expanding the fleet of emergency ambulances to 200 by the end of 2019, as per the minimum requirements of a mega-city such as Karachi. The intention is, in an incremental manner, to expand the services throughout the province of Sindh.

Already operational in the Thatta and Sujjawal districts on Sindh, is the Sindh Peoples' Ambulance Service (SPAS) which is a similar public-private partnership between the provincial government and Aman Foundation. It has a fleet of 25 ambulances providing life-saving services in these primarily rural areas and has conducted thousands of interventions, including 100+ baby deliveries inside the vehicles themselves.

Aman Community Health Program (ACHP)
The Aman Community Health Program (ACHP) was started in 2012 to spread healthcare awareness in the communities of Korangi and Landhi through Aman Community Health Workers. They were trained to initiate health inquiries and follow-ups that are common in communities where quality healthcare is least accessible.
ACHP’s primary objectives were to bridge gaps between diagnosis and treatment, reduce the burden of diseases and raise awareness of community health challenges and solutions to empower underserved communities.
Areas of focus included communicable & non-communicable diseases, maternal, neonatal & child health, as well as family planning. The approach includes door-to-door visits, health screenings, referrals of cases to appropriate health care facilities and provision of supplies and services. This program has been successfully concluded in June 2018, catering to more than 630,000 households in the region of Korangi and Landhi. MCPR (modern contraceptive prevalence rate) was 53% in this population and 89% of the population has been provided with Expanded Program on Immunization (EPI) vaccination coverage.

SUKH Initiative
The Sukh Initiative, a tripartite partnership between Aman Foundation, Bill & Melinda Gates Foundation, and the David & Lucile Packard Foundation is a family planning program. Due to a lack of focus on maternal and child health, the Sukh initiative aims to alleviate these challenges by providing access to quality contraceptive methods to promote the well-being of mothers and children as well as support the overall health and development of communities in some of the most underserved areas of Karachi.
The program has covered a population of 1 million in the districts of Bin Qasim, Malir, Landhi and Korangi.

Aman TeleHealth
Aman TeleHealth is a 24-hour helpline which provides diagnostic services and health advice over the phone, along with mental health and family planning counseling. In a country where 80 percent of healthcare spending is self-financed, healthcare is a luxury few can afford. Aman TeleHealth aims to narrow this gap by offering consultations, advice, and triage for the most common illnesses over the phone. 
In addition to dealing with common physical ailments, it offers mental health advice via a mental health counselor. The call center operates 24/7 and has over 5,500 healthcare facilities and approx. 23,000 doctors (Pakistan Medical and Dental Council PMDC verified) mapped on its system enabling callers to seek information about the facilities within their vicinity.
The number to dial to avail medical assistance 24/7 is 9123.

Aman Education

Aman Institute for Vocational Training (Aman Tech)
Aman Tech is a state-of-the-art vocational training institute designed to transform the youth of Pakistan into productive members of society by teaching them both vocational and soft skills and aligning them to the needs of the local and international labor market.
The program includes short vocational skills courses and soft skills training. This boosts the employability of the graduates as it equips them with practical trades and life-enhancing skills such as computer training, personal grooming and business etiquettes. All courses are accredited by City & Guilds UK and Sindh Board of Technical Education, and certification is provided to successful students by these leading institutions. This has resulted in a high job placement rate of 65% for Aman Tech graduates.
Aman Tech trains students in 13 different trades making them market-ready in 6 months. Aman Tech offers courses for females as well including Project Subh-e-Kiran, a 4-month free-of-cost stitching course funded by UK Aid from the UK government and British Asian Trust, and being managed by The Aman Foundation.
Over 13,900 graduates have completed skills training programs at Aman Tech with a 65% employment rate.

INJAZ Pakistan
INJAZ Pakistan is a social impact organization initiated and incubated in April 2012. INJAZ Pakistan works on developing and encouraging entrepreneurial, work-readiness and financial literacy skills amongst children between the ages of 14 to 24, in Pakistan. In 2016, International Center for Chemical and Biological Sciences (ICCBS), University of Karachi signed a Memorandum of Understanding (MoU) with INJAZ Pakistan for facilitating and conducting training sessions at ICCBS.

References

Medical and health organisations based in Pakistan
Non-profit organisations based in Pakistan
1991 establishments in Pakistan
Ambulance services in Pakistan